The  was a constituency that represents Kōchi Prefecture in the House of Councillors in the Diet of Japan. Councillors are elected to the house by single non-transferable vote (SNTV) for six-year terms. Since the establishment of the current House of Councillors electoral system in 1947, the district has elected two Councillors, one each at elections held every three years. With its 618,834 registered voters (as of September 2015) it is the third-smallest electoral district for the house. To address the imbalance in representation between districts, a 2015 revision of the Public Officers Election Law will see the district merged with the Tokushima At-large district to create the Tokushima-Kochi At-large district; this change will begin to take effect at the 2016 election, at which one Councillor will be elected.

The Councillors currently representing Kochi are:
 Hajime Hirota (Democratic Party of Japan; term ends in 2016)
 Kojiro Takano (Liberal Democratic Party; term ends in 2019)

Elected Councillors

Election results

References

Footnotes

Districts of the House of Councillors (Japan)